The women's 1,500 metres at the 2016 IPC Athletics European Championships was held at the Stadio Olimpico Carlo Zecchini in Grosseto from 11 to 16 June.

Medalists

See also
List of IPC world records in athletics

References

1,500 metres
2016 in women's athletics
1500 metres at the World Para Athletics European Championships